is a series of video medleys, and is also the title of one of the videos in the series. The original video was created by Shimo (しも), a user of the video sharing website Nico Nico Douga.

Overview
Kumikyoku Nico Nico Douga was first uploaded at 5 June 2007 with the title 「Nico Nico Douga中毒の方へ贈る一曲」 and continued to be worked on. A second version was uploaded on 23 June. The number of views skyrocketed to over 1.8 million after little more than 2 months.  From July to August in 2007, the video maintained first position in number of views, with over 3.3 million comments, and was in over 100,000  (at the height of its popularity. Its popularity was thanks in part to subsequent videos.

 4 June 2007:  uploaded by Shimo.
 23 June 2007:  uploaded by Shimo.
 18 September 2007:  uploaded by Shimo. Revised version uploaded 18 September 2007.
 10 April 2008:  uploaded by Shimo.
 23 July 2008: , a shortened version of Ryūseigun, released
 2 June 2009:  uploaded by Shimo.
 19 March 2010: , a shortened version of Nanairo, released
 23 June 2011: , a remix of Suite: 'Nico Nico Douga' uploaded by Shimo, 4 years after the original Suite.
 15 April 2012:  uploaded by Shimo.

Reception

5 days after the original video was uploaded, another user uploaded a version with his own singing. After that, many users began to upload spin-offs (such as the play version, dance version) of the original video. Some of the lyrics from the original songs were improvised or mondegreen were used instead. Users sometime compile multiple user versions of the medley to form a 'chorus' video.  Most of these "auditory illusions" were already well-known/prevalent on Nico Nico Douga.

The videos attracted a lot of singers who would add their own vocals to karaoke versions of the songs, the number of such videos far exceeded that of earlier videos. 

It's often misunderstood that the title  is not a "music selection" in a strict sense, only "Nico Nico Douga medley songs used in it".

Some other videos posted include ones where users played instruments (recorder, piano, violin, a variety of drums and even bamboo flutes and other musical instruments) or an entire Orchestra performing an instrumental version of the song.

The medleys were also translated and sung in English, Hebrew, French, Korean, Chinese, Thai, Malay and Tagalog. Two such well known versions are the ones by C_Chat and the National Central University.

2 August 2007, C_Chat, a user of the Taiwan BBS board PTT Bulletin Board System, used a week of time to compile a group of people singing Kumikyoku in a chorus and also uploaded it to Nico Nico Douga. This is the first video based on Kumikyoku Nico Nico Douga outside Japan, and also let Japanese users realise that Nico Nico Douga had a lot of overseas users.

Lists of songs used
The following is a list of songs used in the videos of the Kumikyoku Nico Nico Douga series.

A Song for Nico Nico Dougaholics

Suite: Nico Nico Douga

Nico Nico Douga Monogatari.wav

Nico Nico Douga Ryūseigun

Nico Nico Douga Ryūseimusume

Although not officially in this version of the medley, the melodies of the songs Montagues and Capulets (Dance of the Knights) and You are the Prince of Tennis from The Prince of Tennis musicals can still be heard.

Nanairo no Nico Nico Douga

The last section (ED1 - ED28) is also called "HEROES".

Nanairo no Nico Nico Douga (mobile rainbow mix)

Suite: Nico Nico Douga Revision

Super Suite: Nico Nico Douga

Others
On 26 December 2007, Lantis published 「らき☆すたRe-Mix002〜『ラキスタノキワミ、アッー』【してやんよ】〜」, a "mixed music collection"  based on Lucky Star. One of the songs in the collection, 「組曲『らき☆すた動画』」, was to pay tribute to the creativity of Kumikyoku Nico Nico Douga.

5 March 2008， the same company published a similar music CD called “”.

『ランティス組曲 feat. Nico Nico Artists』も 「組曲『ニコニコ動画』」

Somewhere around 19 October 2008, a Super Mario World ROM hacker created an automatic level in the game that would play the song using sound effects from the game (with the original song playing in the background) The video has gotten more than 2 million views across all the reuploads of the video on YouTube, and has become an important part of the Super Mario World ROM Hacking community.

In 2012, a team of users on YouTube collaborated to create "8 Sides of Nico Nico Douga", a remix of Nanairo Nico Nico Douga using audio samples from Jack Black's appearance on Sesame Street. The second part of "RAINBOW GIRL" was replaced with "Karate" by Tenacious D.

Videos

Original videos
「ニコニコ動画中毒の方へ贈る一曲」
「組曲『ニコニコ動画』」
「組曲『ニコニコ動画』」 - Transloaded to YouTube
「ニコニコ動画物語.wav」
「ニコニコ動画流星群」
「七色のニコニコ動画」
組曲『ニコニコ動画』改
「超組曲『ニコニコ動画』」

Cover videos
組曲『NICONICO動畫』、台灣人大合唱（PTT）
中央大學歌謠祭「組曲『NICONICO動畫』」
NICONICO動畫『裏組曲』(衍生作品之一)
組曲『NICONICO動畫』中文版 ver.elielin - YouTube (publicly viewable)

See also
 Nico Nico Douga

Notes

References

External links
 https://web.archive.org/web/20100813070834/http://journal.mycom.co.jp/articles/2010/04/30/nico_guide/index.html – Report 
 Nico Nico Douga Medley Database: (English) (Japanese)

Music medleys
Kadokawa Dwango franchises
Internet memes
2007 web series debuts